Corbatón is a town in Cosa, Jiloca, Teruel, Spain.

References 

Populated places in the Province of Teruel